John Francis Gaha (14 April 1894 – 18 March 1966) was an Australian politician. Born in Narrabri, New South Wales, he was educated at St Joseph's College in Sydney and the National University of Ireland, becoming a doctor and a house surgeon in Dublin. Returning to Australia in 1920, he settled in Tasmania, where he established a private practice at Hobart; he was a health officer 1925–1929. In 1933, he was elected as a Labor member to the Tasmanian Legislative Council for Hobart, serving as Minister for Health 1934–1943. In 1943, he transferred to federal politics, winning the House of Representatives seat of Denison by defeating sitting United Australia Party MP Arthur Beck. He retired from federal politics in 1949, returning to Tasmanian politics as a member for Denison in the House of Assembly in 1950. He was chief secretary, Minister for Police and Minister for Transport 1959–1961. Gaha left the Assembly in 1964 and died two years later in 1966.

References

External links
 Condolence motion in Hansard

Australian Labor Party members of the Parliament of Australia
Members of the Tasmanian Legislative Council
Members of the Tasmanian House of Assembly
Members of the Australian House of Representatives for Denison
Members of the Australian House of Representatives
1894 births
1966 deaths
Alumni of the National University of Ireland
20th-century Australian politicians